Tirrannaville is a locality in the Goulburn Mulwaree Council, New South Wales, Australia. It is located about 11 km south of Goulburn on the road to Braidwood. It was formerly called Terranna, which is the name of the parish covering most of the locality. The northern part of the defined locality, including the small settlement of Tirrannaville and cemetery, is in the parish of Goulburn. The locality mostly consists of grazing land.

Railway stations

Komungla station

A station was established on the Bombala railway line at Komungla in what is now the locality of Tirrannaville in 1884 and it was originally called Bangalore. A small settlement developed there and the station was renamed Komungla in 1916. The station was closed in 1971.

Tirranna station

Another station or siding was established under the name of Tirranna in 1906 and was closed in 1941.

References

Localities in New South Wales
Southern Tablelands
Goulburn Mulwaree Council
Bombala railway line